The Soilers is a 1923 American silent comedy film starring Stan Laurel, and was released in the same year as the Western silent movie drama The Spoilers. The name of one character from the original, "McNamara" is parodied in the James Finlayson character.

Cast
 Stan Laurel - Bob Canister
 Ena Gregory - The girl
 Mae Laurel - Woman in saloon
 James Finlayson - Smacknamara
 Billy Engle - Prospector
 Eddie Baker - Prospector
 George Rowe - Man in saloon
 Jack Ackroyd - Henchman
 Jack Gavin - Prospector
 Marvin Loback - Henchman
 Sammy Brooks
 Al Forbes
 Katherine Grant
 John B. O'Brien
 "Tonnage" Martin Wolfkeil

See also
 List of American films of 1923

References

External links

The Soilers at SilentEra

1923 films
American silent short films
American black-and-white films
1923 comedy films
1923 short films
Films directed by Ralph Ceder
Silent American comedy films
Articles containing video clips
American comedy short films
1920s American films